New College School (officially St Mary's College School) is a private preparatory school for boys aged 4 to 13 in Oxford. It was founded in 1379 by William of Wykeham to provide for the education of 16 choristers for the chapel of New College, Oxford.

History 
New College School traces its origins to November 1379 when it was founded by William of Wykeham, Bishop of Winchester, as part of the foundation of the College of St Mary of Winchester in Oxford, more commonly known as New College. Wykeham himself paid for the choirboys, chaplains and clerks to sing for services at chapel. Records from the 1620s state that choirboys were accommodated on the College site itself, using an attic as the schoolroom. Despite a brief disruption due to the English Civil War the "school" continued to thrive. By the late 17th century, the vestry and song-room were refitted to accommodate new boys, marking the moment when the school started educating both choristers and non-choristers. The school did not have a permanent home for some years, moving back and forth between the College buildings and various sites outside the College. The current site was purchased in 1903 from Merton College. The school's houses (Eagles, Lions, Wolves, and Hawks) were renamed in the early twenty-first century to commemorate four famous figures from New College's past.

Although no longer exclusively educating choristers, the school maintains its ties with the College: the College's Warden is Chair of the school's governing committee and the school's pupils use the College sports facilities.

Location and facilities 
New College School is located on Savile Road in central Oxford, near New College. The school site has a sports hall which is used for multiple sports and shares New College's playing fields and cricket nets. Its most recent upgrade is the revamped sports pavilion, reopened in 2013.

Extracurricular activities 
Sports form a major part of the school calendar. All boys from Year 3 to 8 are required to play football (Michaelmas term), hockey (Hilary term), and Cricket or Tennis (Trinity term). The school has a partnership with Oxford United F.C. and the England U16 rugby team which allows the boys to receive external coaching sessions. There are also lunchtime and after-school activities sessions where boys can participate in various hobby and interest clubs. Lunchtime activities are run every day apart from Wednesday and the after school programme operates on Monday - Friday evenings.

Notable alumni of New College School 
Staff
Henry Bright: teacher and author
Charles Oliver Mules: Bishop of Nelson (New Zealand)

Pupils
Thomas Allen (1681–1755): clergyman and author
Stephen Boxer: actor
George Valentine Cox (1786–1875) [Master of NCS]: author
Sir (Donald) Keith Falkner (1900–1994): singer and Director of the Royal College of Music
Edmund Finnis: composer
Roland Fleming: scientist
James Gilchrist: tenor
Howard Goodall: singer, composer, and broadcaster
Theo Green: film composer
Tim Hayward: writer, and broadcaster
Orlando Higginbottom: musician better known as  Totally Enormous Extinct Dinosaurs
Sir Richard Goodwin Keats (1757–1834): admiral, Governor of the Royal Naval Hospital in Greenwich, and mentor to Nelson and King William IV
David Mitchell: comedian
Ian Partridge tenor
John Rogers (bap. 1678-1729): clergyman, royal chaplain, and author
Paul Spicer: organist, producer, conductor, composer, Professor of Choral Conducting at the Royal College of Music
Joseph Trapp (1679–1747): clergyman, poet, playwright, first Professor of Poetry at the University of Oxford, translator of complete works of Virgil (1731)
William Tuckwell (1829–1919) [Master of NCS]: author and ‘radical parson’
Howard Williams: conductor
Francis Wise (1695–1767): author, archaeologist, Radcliffe Librarian
Anthony Wood (1632–1695): antiquarian, historian, and author

See also 
List of choir schools
List of the oldest schools in the world

References

Further reading
Halford Smith, Alic (1952). New College, Oxford, and its Buildings. Oxford: Oxford University Press.

Oxford Dictionary of National Biography.

External links 
New College School website
Profile at the Independent Schools Council website

1379 establishments in England
Boys' schools in Oxfordshire
Choir schools in England
Educational institutions established in the 14th century
Schools in Oxford
School
Preparatory schools in Oxfordshire
Church of England private schools in the Diocese of Oxford
University-affiliated secondary schools